Warner can refer to:

People 
 Warner (writer)
 Warner (given name)
 Warner (surname)

Fictional characters 
 Yakko, Wakko, and Dot Warner, stars of the animated television series Animaniacs
 Aaron Warner, a character in Shatter Me series

Education
 Warner Pacific University, Portland, Oregon
 Warner University, Lake Wales, Florida

Places 
 Warner (crater), a lunar impact crater in the southern part of the Mare Smythii
 Warner Theatre (disambiguation), several theatres

Australia
 Warner, Queensland

In Canada
 County of Warner No. 5, a municipal district in Alberta
 Warner, Alberta, a village 
 Warner elevator row, Warner, Alberta

In the United States
 Warner, New Hampshire, a New England town
 Warner (CDP), New Hampshire, the main village in the town
 Warner, Ohio, an unincorporated community
 Warner, Oklahoma
 Warner, South Dakota

Organisations
 Warner Aerocraft, an American aircraft manufacturer based in Seminole, Florida
 Warner Aircraft Corporation, an American manufacturer of radial aircraft engines in 1928 and early 1930s
 Warner Books (now Grand Central Publishing), a division of Hachette Book Group USA
Warner Bros. Discovery, a multinational mass media and entertainment conglomerate based in New York City
 Warner Bros., a film and television production company
 Warner Music Group, record label group founded as Warner Bros. Records
 Warner Leisure Hotels, UK hotel chain
 Warner–Lambert, now merged with Pfizer, a pharmaceutical company

Record labels 
 Warner Alliance
 Warner Records
 Warner Curb Records
 Warner Music Australasia
 Warner Music Canada
 Warner-Spector Records

See also
 
 Irnerius (sometimes referred to as Warnerius), an Italian jurist from the 11th century
 Justice Warner (disambiguation)
 Senator Warner (disambiguation)